Kishidaia is a genus of ground spiders that was first described by T. Yaginuma in 1960. it contains three species and one subspecies: K. albimaculata, K. conspicua, K. c. concolor, and K. coreana.

References

Araneomorphae genera
Gnaphosidae
Spiders of Asia